St. Thomas Aquinas Catholic Secondary School (STA) is a Catholic secondary school in London, Ontario, located in the neighbourhood of Oakridge in the west end of the city.  It currently serves students in the London District Catholic School Board in the London Areas of Byron, Oakridge, Westmount, Lambeth, as well as some areas outside of the city limits such as Delaware, Komoka and even as far as Mount Brydges.

Mission Statement: The purpose of St. Thomas Aquinas Catholic Secondary School is to present the Catholic tradition and teachings in all our pedagogy to prepare our students to meet the demands of modern life within the context of the gospel.

Prayer of St. Thomas Aquinas: Grant us, O Lord our God, minds to know you, hearts to seek you, wisdom to find you, conduct pleasing to you, faithful perseverance in waiting for you, and a hope of finally embracing you. AMEN

History 
St. Thomas Aquinas was first established at the site of the former St. Joseph Catholic school on Charles Street in 1990. Construction began on the school's permanent site in 1993 on 8 hectares in the northwest sector of London, Ontario, adjacent to the Byron neighbourhood. The current building, opened in 1994 and 152,314 square feet in size, was highly technologically advanced for its time with internet access throughout the school, as well as cable television and VCRs in virtually every classroom.
 
The school was built with the expectation that it would house 945 students. Its peak enrollment hit approximately 1,800 students in the late 1990s, and has since stabilized to around 1100 students.

STA was built with a "cafetorium", a space which could be used as either a cafeteria or auditorium with portable seating stored under the stage. This cafetorium has been the site of many assemblies, school shows, and other various school events and performances. It was also used as a temporary location for weekend Masses for St. George's Parish during church reconstruction in 1998–99.

The school is well known throughout Southwestern Ontario as a school with a proud tradition of strong academic focus, tremendous athletic successes, and magnificent artistic performances and programs, all embedded within a community that celebrates its Catholic faith first and foremost. The school has a double gym, fitness room, library, computer labs, performance stage and an indoor track.

Academics 
STA has traditionally been successful academically since its opening, and is currently rated 89th of the province's 719 high schools. According to a London Free Press report, 21% of graduating students entered college, 63% entered university, and 16% entered the workforce.

Arts 

The Arts Department has a variety of programs ranging from Instrumental Music, Vocal, Visual Arts, Dance, Dramatic Arts to Technical Theatre.

Sports 
STA generally performs well in most of its athletic endeavours.  Notable championships include OFSAA AAAA Girls Hockey champions (three times: 200?, 2006, 2007), OFSAA AAAA Boys Hockey champions (1999, 2020), and Western Bowl football champions (in 2006).  They have won numerous local, regional, and provincial championships in various other sports, including badminton, basketball, cross-country, curling, golf, soccer, swimming, tennis, track & field, volleyball, rowing, baseball, and wrestling.

Noted alumni

 Joe Bartoch – Olympic swimmer
 Sam Gagner – NHL hockey player
 Chris Haslam – professional skateboarder
 Lanni Marchant – Canadian marathon record holder
 Bryan Lee O'Malley – cartoonist famous for Scott Pilgrim series
 Isaac Ratcliffe - NHL hockey player
 Adam Stern – major league baseball player
 Nick Suzuki - NHL hockey player
Shelina Zadorsky – Canadian Women’s National Soccer Team player, earned a bronze medal at the 2016 Olympics in Brazil

See also 
List of high schools in Ontario

References

External links 
Saint Thomas Aquinas Catholic Secondary School

Educational institutions established in 1993
High schools in London, Ontario
Catholic secondary schools in Ontario
1993 establishments in Ontario